The Sanaa school shooting was a school shooting where 6 people were killed by Mohammad Ahman al-Nazari in Sanaa, Yemen on 30 March 1997. Nazari was convicted for the killings and sentenced to death. He was executed a week later.

Background 
Mohammad Ahman al-Nazari was a 48-year-old resident of Sanaa, Yemen, and a veteran of the Soviet–Afghan War, where he had fought in the Mujahideen against the Soviet Union during their invasion of Afghanistan. Nazari's five children attended the Tala'i Private School in the Asbahi neighborhood of Sana'a, where it was alleged that one of his daughters had been molested by the school administrator, despite there being no evidence found to confirm this. Nazari had also previously been employed as a bus driver for Tala'i Private School and the nearby Musa Bin Nusayr School, but was fired for unknown reasons some time before the shooting.

Shooting  
Armed with an illegally obtained Kalashnikov assault rifle, Nazari waited at the school for the headmistress and killed her by shooting her in the head. After killing a cafeteria worker and injuring a bus driver who came to help, Nazari entered the school building and walked from classroom to classroom, shooting indiscriminately at teachers and students. Subsequently, he went to nearby Musa Bin Nusayr School, where he continued his shooting rampage.

Arrest and conviction 
Nazari killed a total of six people and wounded 12 others before he was eventually injured and arrested by police. After officially being declared sane, Nazari (whose name was also reported as being Hassan Ali al-Baadani or Muhammad Ahmad al-Naziri) was taken to trial where he was found guilty for the six murders, and sentenced to death the next day. Nazari's daughters had fought against the courts to appeal against their father's execution but lost.

Execution 
On 5 April 1997, Nazari was executed by firing squad with five shots in the chest, in an empty lot located between the two schools where he had committed the shootings. After his execution, the initial sentence for Nazari's corpse to be crucified in a public area for three days was repealed, instead the corpse was kicked to a pulp by angry citizens and burned in the streets of Sanaa

The daughter who was allegedly raped by the school administrator committed suicide five years later, while Nazari's other four children reportedly all died in a train accident in 2006.

Victims
Asma Abd al-Bari, headmistress of Tala'i school
Muhammad Yahya al-Ulufi, teacher at Tala'i school
Husayn Ali Qa'id al-Ba'dani
Ali Muhammad Muqbil al-Awadi 
Imad Muhammad al-Raymi
Unidentified student

External links
Gunman kills eight at two schools in Yemen, CNN (March 30, 1997)
Yemen - Gunman goes on shooting spree in schools, Associated Press (March 31, 1997) (Video)
Yemen - Trial of gunman, Associated Press (April 2, 1997) (Video)

See also 

 List of massacres in Yemen

References

Massacres in 1997
Mass murder in 1997
Man-made disasters in Yemen
School massacres
Deaths by firearm in Yemen
20th century in Sanaa
Massacres in Yemen
School shootings in Asia
Mass shootings in Yemen
1997 in Yemen
March 1997 events in Asia
1997 murders in Yemen
Crime in Sanaa